Taunton is the county town of Somerset, England.

Taunton may also refer to:

Places

Australia 

Taunton, Queensland, a locality
Taunton National Park, a scientific national park in Queensland
County of Taunton, a cadastral division in South Australia
Taunton, South Australia, a locality

United Kingdom 

 Taunton (UK Parliament constituency), a former parliamentary constituency in Somerset
 Taunton Deane, a local government district with borough status in Somerset
 Taunton Stop Line, a World War II defensive line in south west England
 Taunton Racecourse, located near the town from which it takes its name
 Taunton, Greater Manchester, a suburb of Ashton-under-Lyne

United States 

 Taunton, Massachusetts
 Taunton, Minnesota
 Taunton, New York
 Taunton, Washington
 Taunton River, historically called the Taunton Great River, a river in southern Massachusetts

People
 Baron Taunton, defunct British peerage title
 Ethelred Taunton, English Roman Catholic priest
 Kristen Taunton, Canadian field hockey player
 Larry Taunton, American author
 Mack Taunton, vocalist
 Peter Taunton, CEO of Snap Fitness
 Scott Taunton, media executive
 Sussan Taunton, Chilean actress
 William de Taunton, medieval Bishop of Winchester

Other 
 Taunton train fire, a fire in an English sleeping car train on 6 July 1978
 Taunton Period, a British Bronze Age metalworking period, see Penard Period
 Taunton Press
 The Siege of Taunton, during the English Civil War
 Taunton's Grammar School Southampton, see Highfield, Hampshire

See also
 Tauntaun, a fictional creature in the Star Wars universe
 Saunton,  a village in north Devon, England
 Tawstock, a village in north Devon, England